The Heritage Acres Farm Museum is an open-air museum in southern Alberta, Canada.  In particular it showcases antique machinery and vintage cars. Buildings from surrounding communities have been moved to the historic site and restored to various years within the twentieth century including a historic prairie grain elevator and many different forms of farm machinery and equipment from the 1900s to 1960s. As well the Crystal Village a miniature village of various buildings made completely from telephone insulators made by a local rancher. Heritage Acres Farm Museumhosts annual events including a garage sale in May, Chuckwagon cookoff and horse show in June, Annual show with many farming demonstrations August long weekend, candlelight church service first Friday in December and a Breakfast with Santa the first Saturday in December.

See also

List of museums in Alberta

References

External links
 Heritage Acres Farm Museum

Living museums in Canada
Grain elevator museums in Alberta
Open-air museums in Canada
Farm museums in Alberta